Shelter For Life International (SFL) is a US-based non-profit, non-governmental relief and development organization dedicated to helping severely affected people displaced or made homeless by war, conflict or natural disaster.  SFL is headquartered in Minneapolis, Minnesota and is currently operating in Afghanistan, Iraq, Pakistan, Tajikistan, Haiti and Sudan. 

SFL addresses the need for shelter through the construction of both transitional and permanent homes. SFL provides families emergency assistance needed to shield them from dangerous living conditions and then works with them to rebuild their communities and restore lives. Families and communities share responsibility for re-constructing their homes and villages and receive help in the form of training, tools, materials and technical assistance. The majority of construction materials are purchased locally whenever there is availability.

Transitional Shelters
When shelters are urgently needed and there is inadequate time to construct permanent shelters, SFL enables families to build durable transitional shelters. These shelters are temporary in nature, but use basic materials which can be reused in the construction of a permanent home in the future. Transitional shelters provide immediate relief to untenable living situations while offering a sustainable, long-term benefit. They are preferable to the use of tents, which are temporary and not able to withstand prolonged use over time.

Permanent Shelters
Most SFL shelter projects consist of building permanent, durable shelters that use local architecture and simple designs that are able to better withstand earthquakes and other natural disasters. Construction materials vary from country to country depending on local culture and customs, but common materials include handmade mud bricks, concrete blocks, tin sheeting, and clay tiles. Houses are largely constructed by the beneficiary family with support, training, tools, and materials supplied by SFL.

Earthquake and Disaster Mitigation
SFL has received international recognition for implementing shelter designs that incorporate simple, cost-effective technical measures that reduce the damage from earthquakes and other disasters. Construction techniques include reinforced walls, rigid wooden ring beams, corner bracing, and strategic door and window location. Beneficiaries who live in earthquake zones also receive awareness and preparedness training to equip them with the skills and knowledge to survive future disasters.

External links
 Official Site
Non-profit organizations based in Minnesota